Thomas Jager or Thomas Jäger may refer to:
Thomas Jäger (Austrian racing driver), Austrian racing driver
Thomas Jäger, German racing driver
Thomas Jäger, former bassist of Swedish band Draconian 
Tom Jager, American former swimmer

See also